Dominique Jones  (born August 15, 1987) is a former American football tight end. He played college football at Shepherd.

College career
He played college football at Shepherd University in 2010. As a tight end Jones totaled 403 yards on 34 receptions and averaged 11.9 yards a catch. He led the team in touchdown receptions with nine.
The Rams had their furthest Division II playoff run in the school's history and won the WVIAC title before becoming the first WVIAC team to advance to the national semi-finals.

Professional career

Sacramento Mountain Lions
He played the 2011 season for the Sacramento Mountain Lions of the United Football League.

Reading Express
He signed with the Reading Express of the Indoor Football League in 2012.

Indianapolis Colts
On April 30, 2012, he signed with the Indianapolis Colts as a Undrafted free agent. On October 8, 2012, he was released and was re-signed to the practice squad the next day.

Miami Dolphins
On October 24, 2012, he was signed by the Miami Dolphins to join the practice squad. On November 19, 2012, he was released.

Second stint with the Indianapolis Colts
On November 21, 2012, he signed with the Indianapolis Colts.

Jones was released by the Colts on October 22, 2013.

Kansas City Chiefs
On October 30, 2013, he was signed by the Kansas City Chiefs to their practice squad. The Chiefs placed Jones on their active roster on December 7.  He was released by the Chiefs on March 6, 2014.

Buffalo Bills
He signed with the Buffalo Bills on July 26. The Bills released Jones on August 29, 2014.

Denver Broncos
He was signed to the Denver Broncos practice squad on September 9, 2014, and cut on September 5, 2015.

Baltimore Ravens
Jones was signed to the Baltimore Ravens' practice squad on September 7, 2015. On September 24, 2015, he was released by the Ravens.

New York Giants
Jones was signed to the New York Giants' practice squad on October 7, 2015. On October 15, 2015, he was released by the Giants.

Minnesota Vikings
Jones was signed to the Minnesota Vikings' practice squad on November 17, 2015.

Return to Miami
The Dolphins signed Jones to a reserve/futures contract on January 19, 2016, along with Zac Dysert. On September 3, 2016, he was released by the Dolphins as part of final roster cuts. He was re-signed on October 3, 2016. In a Week 9 victory over the New York Jets, Jones was the Dolphins' leading receiver with 3 catches for 42 yards and 1 touchdown, the first of his career. On March 6, 2017, the Dolphins declined to sign Jones to an offer sheet, making him a free agent.

References

External links
 Reading Express bio
 Indianapolis Colts bio

1987 births
Living people
Players of American football from San Diego
Shepherd Rams football players
American football tight ends
American football fullbacks
Sacramento Mountain Lions players
Reading Express players
Indianapolis Colts players
Miami Dolphins players
Kansas City Chiefs players
Buffalo Bills players
Denver Broncos players
Baltimore Ravens players
New York Giants players